Smile is a computer data interchange format based on JSON. It can also be considered a binary serialization of the generic JSON data model, which means tools that operate on JSON may be used with Smile as well, as long as a proper encoder/decoder exists for the tool.
The name comes from the first 2 bytes of the 4 byte header, which consist of Smiley ":)" followed by a linefeed: a choice made to make it easier to recognize Smile-encoded data files using textual command-line tools.

Efficiency
Compared to JSON, Smile is both more compact and more efficient to process (both to read and write).
Part of this is due to more efficient binary encoding (similar to BSON, CBOR and UBJSON), but an additional feature is optional use of back references for property names and values.

Back referencing allows replacing of property names and/or short (64 bytes or less) String values with 1- or 2-byte reference ids.

Implementations
Libraries known to support Smile include:
 Cheshire (Clojure) is a data encoding library that supports Smile as binary alternative to JSON
 Jackson (Java) with Binary dataformat module supporting Smile, Avro, CBOR, Ion and Protocol Buffers
 libsmile (C/C++; wrappers for Ruby, Perl)
 go-smile for decoding Smile data in Golang
 Protostuff (Java) supports multiple data formats for serialization, including Smile, JSON, XML and Protocol Buffers.
 PySmile for encoding/decoding Smile data in Python
 NewSmile for encoding/decoding Smile data in Python >= 3.7
 smile-js for decoding Smile data from Javascript

See also 
 JSON
 BSON
 CBOR
 UBJSON
 Comparison of data serialization formats

References

External links 
 Smile format specification

JSON
Data serialization formats